Chunga may refer to:
Chunga (bird), a genus of birds
La Chunga, Spanish flamenco dancer and painter
Chunga Lagoon, a natural feature in Zambia's Lochinvar National Park
La Chunga, a thoroughbred filly who won the 2005 British Albany Stakes
Chunga, a small mutant Gypsy vacuum cleaner, the putative namesake of the album Chunga's Revenge by Frank Zappa
Nieves Cuesta or La Chuncga, a character on Aquí no hay quien viva
Big Chungus, a popular internet meme.

People with the surname
Bernard Chunga, former Chief Justice of Kenya
Moses Chunga, Zimbabwean retired footballer